Ambodiampana may refer to one of the following locations in Madagascar:

 Ambodiampana, Mananara Nord in Mananara Nord District, Analanjirofo Region
 Ambodiampana, Sambava in Sambava District, Sava Region
 Ambodiampana, Soanierana Ivongo in Soanierana Ivongo District, Analanjirofo Region